is a Japanese actor, voice actor and narrator affiliated with Office Osawa. He has frequently appeared in many anime and video games mainly created by tri-Ace. He won a Male Character Voice Prize in the 2011 Famitsu Awards. Some of his major characters include Abel Nightroad in Trinity Blood, Baldroy in Black Butler, Kokopelli in Bokurano, Tesshin Kataoka in Ace of Diamond, Cross Marian in D.Gray-man, Panther Lily in Fairy Tail, Kugo Ginjo in Bleach and Lasse Aeon in Mobile Suit Gundam 00.  In anime film series, he voices Daisuke Akimi in The Garden of Sinners and Dr. Easter in Mardock Scramble. In live-action shows, he provides the Japanese voice for Dean Winchester in Supernatural as well as in its anime adaptation. In video games, he voices the Japanese dub voice for Nathan Drake in Uncharted series, Chris Redfield in Resident Evil and Project X Zone, Aluze in Valkyrie Profile and Desmond Miles in Assassin's Creed. He is the famous Japanese dubbing roles for Wentworth Miller, Sam Worthington and Will Smith.

Filmography

Anime

Film

Video games

Audio dramas

Tokusatsu

Dubbing

References

External links
 Official agency profile 
 

1966 births
Living people
Japanese male musical theatre actors
Japanese male video game actors
Japanese male voice actors
Male voice actors from Tokyo
20th-century Japanese male actors
21st-century Japanese male actors